The province of Pistoia is a province in the Tuscany region of central Italy. Its capital is the city of Pistoia and the province is landlocked. There are 22 communes in the province.  

The province was formed in 1927 under the rule of Mussolini, and had the lowest income per capita in Tuscany in 1966 due to high poverty levels. This is because the province was mainly agricultural before World War II ended, and has since had to rapidly progress towards industrial capitalism and abandon its agricultural roots. The population of the province has recently been increasing, moving from 268,437 in 2011 to around 292,000 in 2015.

The Mountains of Pistoia and the resorts Abetone and Val di Luce are  tourist destinations for skiers, and the province contains a combination of flat land such as the area of the valley of the Ombrone and the river flowing through it, and mountainous land. The land around the cities of Pistoia and Pescia are popular locations for flower and plant cultivation for global exports, and town and commune Quarrata is known for its wood furniture.

Government

List of presidents of the province of Pistoia

References

External links

Official website  

 
P
Pistoia